The Rey R.1 was an experimental twin engine aircraft type built in France around 1950 to test the effectiveness of sprung hinged wings in automatically correcting roll caused by gusts.

Design and development

In the 1930s there was some interest in aircraft designs with automatic gust stabilization, one example being the Italian Jona J-6. In 1938 Francois Rey and M. Ruoanet took out a patent on another stabilization method in which the wings could hinge near their roots along a line oblique to the span.  This meant that when a tip dropped the wing hinged upwards, increasing its angle of attack and hence its lift, restoring the aircraft to level flight. An aircraft with this feature was built but destroyed during World War II.

After the war Rey built a two-seat, twin engine light aircraft to test the principle of the patent. Its low cantilever wing was tapered to rounded tips and had aspect ratio of 10 and noticeable dihedral.  Renault 6Q  six cylinder air-cooled inverted inline engines were mounted on the wing undersides in deep long cowlings.  The rubber disc sprung hinges began immediately outboard of the rear engine cowling on the wing trailing edge and ran forward and outward to the leading edge at about 45° to the chord. Black sealing strip shows their position in photographs. The R.1's long ailerons were mounted outboard of the hinge, starting close to the hinge connection with the trailing edge.

The rest of the R.1 was completely conventional with an oval fuselage, single seat enclosed cockpit and a second seat behind in a windowed cabin.  The tailplane was straight edged and tapered with strong dihedral and carried twin  vertical tails, oval in profile, at its extreme tips. It had a tailwheel undercarriage with the main wheels in spats on short faired vertical legs from the engine cowlings.

Two R.1s were built, numbered 01 and 02.  01 flew for the first time on 12 December 1949 and 02, which had enlarged fins, on 3 July 1951. 01 was exhibited in flight at the Le Bourget Fête in 1951, where it exhibited its flexing wings and braking parachute. No development or application followed these two aircraft.

Variants
Rey R.1 01 First flown 6 December 1949.
Rey R.1 02 As 01 but with larger fins. First flown 3 January 1951.

Specifications

References

1940s French experimental aircraft
Twin piston-engined tractor aircraft
Low-wing aircraft